Former Ghosts is a project of Freddy Ruppert, former member of This Song Is a Mess But So Am I, with loose collaborations from multiple people including Xiu Xiu frontman Jamie Stewart, Zola Jesus originator Nika Roza Danilova, Yasmine Kittles of Tearist, Annie Lewandowski of Powerdove, and Carla Bozulich. Past live incarnations have included Jherek Bischoff and Sam Mickens.  Ruppert is the lead songwriter on this project. The title of the debut, Fleurs, is a reference to the white-flowered iris (Iris germanica).

Formation

From an interview, Ruppert explained the formation of the band:

Critical reception
Pitchfork said the debut single, "Hold On", "sounds like what might've happened to Joy Division if Ian Curtis had bought a Casio and a four-track and fired the rest of the band."

AllMusic gave Fleurs 3.5/5 stars and said that "Former Ghosts evoke isolation with a fearlessness that few of their peers can match."

The blog Fingers Become Thumbs listed Fleurs as their album of the year (2009), stating: "In all seriousness, this is a dark and intense record in which Ruppert really puts himself out there, so much so that even listening to it can be emotionally draining. In saying that, by the standards of its members its by no means a ‘difficult’ listen, and in fact was intended to be the synth-pop side-project of Freddy and Jamie."

Prefixmag.com found Fleurs to be "intermittently brilliant", but felt it could "benefit greatly from more collaboration and judicious editing of the track list".

Discography
 Fleurs (2009)
 New Love (2010)
 Split 7" w/ Funeral Advantage (2015)

Music videos
 Hold On (dir. Amir Shoucri) watch
 Flowers (dir. Paul Rodriguez) watch
 Taurean Nature (dir. Amir Shoucri) watch

References

External links

 
 Official Site
 Freddy Ruppert's blog
 Official Myspace
 Last.fm page
 Interview with L.A. Record
 Fleurs review at prefixmag.com
 Sputnik Music Review

American noise rock music groups